Robert Hallam ( Alum or Halam; died 4 September 1417) was an English churchman, Bishop of Salisbury and English representative at the Council of Constance. He was Chancellor of the University of Oxford from 1403 to 1405.

Hallam was originally from Cheshire in northern England> and was educated at Oxford University.  As Chancellor he, the Proctors, and all others in the University were pardoned by King Henry IV. On leaving the chancellorship, he was nominated in May 1406 by Pope Innocent VII as Archbishop of York, but the appointment was vetoed by King Henry IV in the same year. However, in 1407 he was consecrated by Pope Gregory XII at Siena as Bishop of Salisbury. As bishop, Hallam supported various churches and shrines in his diocese with grants of episcopal indulgences.

At the Council of Pisa in 1409, Hallam was one of the English representatives. On 6 June 1411, Antipope John XXIII (Baldassare Cardinal Cossa) purported to make Hallam a pseudocardinal, but this title was not recognised.

At the Council of Constance, in November 1414, Hallam was the chief English envoy. There he took a prominent position, as an advocate of Church reform and of the superiority of the council to the pope. He played a leading part in the discussions leading to the deposition of Antipope John XXIII on 29 May 1415, but was less concerned with the trials of Jan Hus and Jerome of Prague. Sigismund, Holy Roman Emperor, through whose influence the council had been assembled, was absent during the whole of 1416 on a diplomatic mission in France and England; but when he returned to Constance in January 1417, as the open ally of the English king, Hallam as Henry V's trusted representative obtained increased importance, and contrived to emphasise English prestige by delivering the address of welcome to Sigismund.  Afterwards, under Henry's direction, he supported the emperor in trying to secure a reform of the Church, before the council proceeded to the election of a new pope. This matter was still undecided when Hallam died suddenly on 4 September 1417. His executors were Masters Richard Hallum, John Fyton, John Hikke, with William Clynt, Thomas Hallum, Thomas Faukys, clerk, & Humfrey Rodeley

After Hallam's death the cardinals were able to secure the immediate election of a new pope, Martin V, who was elected on 11 November: it has been said that the abandonment of the reformers by the English was due entirely to Hallam's death; but it is more likely that Henry V, foreseeing the possible need for a change of front, had given Hallam discretionary powers which the bishop's successors used. Hallam himself had the confidence of Sigismund and was generally respected for his straightforward independence. He was buried in Constance Cathedral, where his tomb near the high altar is marked by a brass of English workmanship.

Citations

References

Further reading
Derschka, H., "Die Grabplatte des Robert Hallum. Zur Beisetzung des Bischofs von Salisbury im Konstanzer Münster vor 600 Jahren." Schriften des Vereins für Geschichte des Bodensees und seiner Umgebung 135 (2017) 97–121. Ostfildern: Jan Thorbecke Verlag. .
Proceedings of the Society of Antiquaries of London, Vol.1, From April 1843 to April 1849, London, 1849, Thursday June 1, 1843, article re Bishop Hallam's tomb

14th-century births
Year of birth unknown
1417 deaths
15th-century diplomats
15th-century English cardinals
Alumni of the University of Oxford
Bishops of Salisbury
Chancellors of the University of Oxford
Medieval English diplomats
People from Cheshire